{{DISPLAYTITLE:C6H6S}}
The molecular formula C6H6S (molar mass: 110.18 g/mol, exact mass: 110.0190 u) may refer to:

 Thiepine, or thiepin
 Thiophenol